"YYZ" is an instrumental rock composition by the band Rush from their 1981 album Moving Pictures. It is one of the band's most popular pieces and was a staple of the band's live performances. The live album Exit... Stage Left (1981) and the concert video recording A Show of Hands (1989) both include versions in which Neil Peart incorporates a drum soloas an interlude on the former, and as a segue out of the piece on the latter.

Title and composition
YYZ is the IATA airport identification code of Toronto Pearson International Airport, near Rush's hometown. The band was introduced to the rhythm as Alex Lifeson flew them into the airport. A VHF omnidirectional range system at the airport broadcasts the YYZ identifier code in Morse code. Peart said in interviews later that the rhythm stuck with them. Peart and Geddy Lee have both said "It's always a happy day when YYZ appears on our luggage tags."

Music video
An official music video was released on YouTube on March 11, 2022.

Awards and nominations
"YYZ" was nominated for a Grammy in the Best Rock Instrumental category in 1982. It lost to "Behind My Camel" by The Police, from their album Zenyatta Mondatta.

Covers

"YYZ" has been covered in whole or in part by:
Godsmack (sampled in "Batalla De Los Tambores" on the Changes live DVD)
Primus, beginning the performance of "John the Fisherman" heard on the 1989 live album Suck on This and in full during other concerts. The first ten seconds of the 1989 live recording are played at the beginning of "To Defy the Laws of Tradition" on the 1990 studio album Frizzle Fry.
Umphrey's McGee
Martin Motnik with Gregg Bissonette on the album Bass Invader, featuring guitarist Mattias "IA" Eklundh
Dream Theater (as Majesty)
Armia (on Soul Side Story live album, under the title "Yyzz")
Muse (during live performances in Canadian cities)
Cygnus and the Sea Monsters, an all-star Rush tribute band featuring Mike Portnoy on drums, Paul Gilbert on guitar, and Sean Malone on bass
 PUP's cover of the Buzzcocks's "Ever Fallen in Love (With Someone You Shouldn't've)" includes the intro to "YYZ" at the very end
Lee and Lifeson performed "YYZ" with Foo Fighters drummer Taylor Hawkins during a Foo Fighters concert at Toronto's Air Canada Centre on March 22, 2008, switching songs midway through "Stacked Actors". In October 2008, Peart performed it with the Buddy Rich Big Band alongside bassist Jeff Berlin as part of the ongoing Buddy Rich Memorial Scholarship Concert series.

See also

List of Rush songs
List of Rush instrumentals

References

1981 songs
Rush (band) songs
Rock instrumentals
Songs written by Geddy Lee
Songs written by Neil Peart
Song recordings produced by Terry Brown (record producer)
Toronto Pearson International Airport
Songs about Canada